Natasha Palha (born 17 January 1994) is an Indian former tennis player.

She was the Indian National Grass Court Tennis champion in 2014.

In her career, Palha won five doubles titles on the ITF Women's Circuit. She reached career-high WTA rankings of 492 in singles and 418 in doubles and she competed on the pro circuit until July 2019.

Playing for India Fed Cup team, Palha has a win–loss record of 2–0.

ITF finals

Singles: 5 (0–5)

Doubles: 14 (5–9)

References

External links
 
 
 

Living people
Indian female tennis players
Tennis players at the 2014 Asian Games
1994 births
21st-century Indian women
21st-century Indian people
Asian Games competitors for India
South Asian Games silver medalists for India
South Asian Games medalists in tennis
Racket sportspeople from Goa
Sportswomen from Goa